The 2016 Unibet European Championship was the ninth edition of the Professional Darts Corporation tournament, the European Championship, which saw the top European players from the ten European tour events compete against each other. The tournament took place from 28–30 October 2016 at the Ethias Arena in Hasselt, Belgium.

Michael van Gerwen was the defending champion, having beaten Gary Anderson 11–10 in the final of the 2015 tournament, and successfully defended his title, winning his third European Championship in a row, after defeating Mensur Suljović 11–1 in the final.

Prize money
The 2016 European Championship will have a total prize fund of £400,000, a £100,000 increase since the previous staging of the tournament. The following is the breakdown of the fund:

Qualification
The 2016 tournament saw a change in terms of qualification. The top 32 players from the European Tour Order of Merit, which is solely based on prize money won in the ten European tour events during the season, qualified for the tournament. So, because of that former 2-time World Champion and previous tournament winner Adrian Lewis failed to qualify, having only played in three European Tour Events, and not winning enough money to make the list.

The following players took part in the tournament after the final standings of ten events, with the top 8 players being seeds:

Draw
The draw was held on 16 October 2016.

References

European Championship (darts)
European Championship
European Championship
Sport in Hasselt